Evrim Sülün Akın (born 12 June 1979) is a Turkish cinema, television, and theatre actress and TV presenter.

Biography

Early years 
Evrim Akın, who lost her father at the age of 17, started her acting career as a trainee at Konak Municipal Theater in İzmir. Then she got enrolled in Müjdat Gezen Art School. There she met Ümit Çırak, and at the age of 17 married him. The marriage was short-lived and they divorced.

Career 

Akın appeared on several sketches of İbo Show. She had her television debut as an actress with the role of Çiçek on İmparator, a TV series written and directed by İbrahim Tatlıses for Show TV. After appearing in minor roles, Akın's main breakthrough came with the hit sitcom Avrupa Yakası, in which she portrayed Selin Yerebakan. She then had the leading role Nana, in popular fantasy child series Bez Bebek. In 2007, she joined Müjdat Gezen, Levent Kırca and Peker Açıkalın as a judge on the TV program Güldür Bakalım. She later worked as a presenter on the program Koca Kafalar TV. Akın continued her career as a TV presenter with TV8's competition program Uzman Avı. Between 2011–2013, she was a cast member on atv's series Alemin Kıralı and portrayed Jülide. She then presented the program Ev Kuşu on Show TV. She then served as a coach on Show TV's competition program Piramit. Between 2016–2019, she presented children's program Çocuktan Al Haberi on the same channel. In 2019, she joined the cast of Güldür Güldür Show and started portraying different characters. Akın has received many awards and nomination throughout her career.

Family 

She is from Paternal side of Albanian origin and from Maternal side of Kurdish roots.

Filmography

Programs 
 Akşam Yıldızı (2004) atv
 Güldür Bakalım (2007) Show TV
 Koca Kafalar TV (2008) Kanal D
 Fort Boyard (2008) FOX
 Uzman Avı (2009–2010) TV8
 Ev Kuşu (2014–2016) Show TV
 Piramit (2015–2016) Show TV
 Çocuktan Al Haberi (2016–2019) Show TV

References

External links 
 

1979 births
Turkish film actresses
Turkish stage actresses
Turkish television actresses
Living people
People from Ankara